TSS-TV Co., Ltd. (株式会社テレビ新広島, Television Shin-Hiroshima System), named Shinhiroshima Telecasting Co., Ltd. until 2008, is a TV station serving in Hiroshima Prefecture and eastern Yamaguchi Prefecture, affiliated with of Fuji News Network (FNN) and Fuji Network System (FNS).

History
TSS was founded on August 8, 1974, and began broadcasting on October 1, 1975. On June 23, 2006, it began broadcasting a digital signal; the analog-digital simulcast period continued until July 24, 2011. TSS-TV moved to its new headquarters on February 22, 2021 in Deshio, Minami-ku, Hiroshima City.

Program

Prime News (TSSプライムニュース)
tss Speak FNN (tssスピーク FNN)
tss News FNN (tssニュース FNN)
tss Sankei Telenews FNN (tss産経テレニュース FNN)
BASEBALL SPECIAL Hiroshima Toyo Carp Live

References

External links
Official website of TV Shinhiroshima

Fuji News Network
Mass media in Hiroshima
Companies based in Hiroshima
Television stations in Japan
Television channels and stations established in 1975